Diálogo Andino, subtitled Revista de Historia, Geografía y Cultura Andina, is a triannual peer-reviewed academic journal covering history, ethnohistory, cultural geography, and ethnography with particular, but not exclusive, focus on the Andean region. The journal was established in 1982 and is published by the Departamento de Ciencias Históricas y Geográficas of the University of Tarapacá. The editor-in-chief is Rodrigo Ruz Zagal (University of Tarapacá).

Abstracting and indexing
The journal is abstracted and indexed in ERIH PLUS, Latindex, and Scopus.

References

External links

Ethnography journals
History of the Americas journals
Academic journals published by universities of Chile
Publications established in 1982
Triannual journals
Spanish-language journals
Latin American studies journals